Stipe Vučur (born 22 May 1992) is an Austrian professional footballer who plays as a centre-back.

Club career

Austrian Bundesliga
On 30 May 2013, Vučur signed a two-year contract with Wacker Innsbruck.

Zweite Bundesliga
After attracting interest from several Austrian clubs, Vučur signed for 2. Bundesliga side Erzgebirge Aue on 3 June 2014, for an undisclosed fee signing a three-year contract with the German club. He dreamed of one day playing in the Bundesliga.

Vučur signed for 1. FC Kaiserslautern on 4 June 2018 on a three-year contract. He played regularly and was linked with several clubs.

Croatia
On 27 June 2018, Vučur signed a three-year contract with Hajduk Split. After being lost for 2019 with a knee injury he did not extend his contract in Hajduk and left the club in the summer of 2020.

Hallescher FC
On 20 October 2020, Vučur joined German club Hallescher FC until the end of the 2020–21 season.

FCSB
On 4 June 2021, FCSB signed a one-year contract with Vucur, with an option to extend for a further year.

FK Žalgiris 
On 8 February 2023, Žalgiris Club announced about the new players.

Personal life
Vučur was born in Salzburg, Austria to Bosnian Croat parents.

References

External links
 
 
 

1992 births
Living people
Footballers from Salzburg
Austrian footballers 
Austrian people of Croatian descent 
Croats of Bosnia and Herzegovina
USK Anif players
FC Lustenau players
SV Seekirchen players
FC Wacker Innsbruck (2002) players
FC Erzgebirge Aue players
1. FC Kaiserslautern players
HNK Hajduk Split players
Hallescher FC players
FC Steaua București players
Association football central defenders
Austrian expatriate footballers
Expatriate footballers in Germany
Austrian expatriate sportspeople in Germany
Expatriate footballers in Croatia
Austrian expatriate sportspeople in Croatia
Expatriate footballers in Romania
Austrian expatriate sportspeople in Romania 
Austrian Football Bundesliga players
2. Liga (Austria) players
2. Bundesliga players
3. Liga players 
Croatian Football League players
Liga I players